Sven Verner Furberg (16 April 1920 – 15 March 1983) was a Norwegian chemist, biologist, and crystallographer who first proposed a helical structure for DNA. Furberg suggested a single-chain helical structure in 1949, which he referred to as a "zig-zag" chain. In 1952, his structure of DNA was published in the journal Acta Chemica Scandinavica. In this paper, he deduced that DNA forms a helix from the crystal structure and density value of nucleosides and other related molecules. A year later, this paper was cited by James Watson and Francis Crick in Molecular Structure of Nucleic Acids: A Structure for Deoxyribose Nucleic Acid.	

1920 births
1983 deaths
Norwegian chemists